"My Heart Is Set on You" is a song written and recorded by American country music artist Lionel Cartwright.  It was released in July 1990 as the second single from the album I Watched It on the Radio.  The song reached number seven on the Billboard Hot Country Singles & Tracks chart.

Critical reception
Dan Herbeck of The Buffalo News compared Cartwright's sound to Ricky Skaggs, and said that the song was "a blatantly commercial but bouncy little song."

Chart performance

Year-end charts

References

1990 singles
Lionel Cartwright songs
Song recordings produced by Tony Brown (record producer)
Songs written by Lionel Cartwright
MCA Records singles
1990 songs